The Necrophiliac is the debut novel by French writer, Gabrielle Wittkop (1920–2002), written in 1972. A transgressive, epistolary novel in the form of a diary, follows the life of Parisian necrophile, Lucien N. The middle-aged antique dealer appears normal to the outside world, but lives a secret life at night, searching for corpses to satisfy his macabre fetish, digging up bodies from Montparnasse Cemetery to the catacombs of Naples. The novel was not translated into English until 2011, by Don Bapst.

Reception
Nicholas Lezard, writing for The Guardian, wrote "This would be a poor and revolting little book...if it did not have such a poised tone and sensibility, such intelligence, behind it...This is a masterpiece." Publishers Weekly gave a negative review, writing "While the material is inarguably gruesome, it's not especially smart or alarming, though it may hold some appeal to the young and disaffected who haven't yet been turned on to the marquis de Sade."

References 

1972 French novels
1972 debut novels
French erotic novels
Novels about necrophilia
Epistolary novels
Novels set in Paris
Novels set in Naples